Kelly Klein (born January 28, 1986), is an American professional wrestler who is currently a free agent. She is best known for her time in Ring of Honor, where she was a record three-time Women of Honor World Champion.

Professional wrestling career

Ring of Honor (2015–2019) 
Klein made her debut at Ring of Honor (ROH) on October 24, 2015, at Night 2 of the Glory By Honor XIV event in Dayton, Ohio, defeating Ray Lyn in one minute via submission.

Klein made her televised debut on the June 26, 2016, episode of Ring of Honor Wrestling, from Nashville, Tennessee. In the main event of the first ever episode of Women of Honor, she defeated Taeler Hendrix via submission. On the December 14, 2016, episode of Ring of Honor Wrestling, the second WOH special, she faced ODB in a winning effort when ODB passed out to Klein's submission.

As a heel, she went on an undefeated streak in ROH until it was ended by Karen Q with help from Deonna Purrazzo during an event in May 2017. This led to a triple threat match in July in the 3rd Women of Honor event, which Karen Q also ended up winning. Klein later defeated Purrazzo in another singles match on the July 29 tapings, with the win coming after Karen Q turned heel and attacked Purrazzo. At the 2018 Final Battle event, Klein won the Women of Honor World Championship for the first time, where she defeated the champion Sumie Sakai in a Four Corner Survival match, which also involved Madison Rayne and Karen Q. At Night 2 of Bound By Honor on February 10, 2019, she lost the title to Mayu Iwatani, ending her reign at 58 days. Klein regained the championship on April 6, 2019 at ROH's Madison Square Garden debut, the G1 Supercard, and shook hands with Iwatani afterwards, turning face in the process. Klein was attacked afterwards by the debuting Velvet Sky and Angelina Love, who were joined by Mandy Leon, with Leon turning heel by attacking Klein from behind.

On November 22, 2019, it was revealed that Klein would be let go by ROH whilst recovering from post-concussion syndrome and while still being the reigning Women of Honor World Champion. She previously spoke out against the company on Twitter for refusing to pay her a living wage and ROH not having a concussion protocol and not allowing her time off to heal from injury. It was these comments that reportedly led to ROH deciding not to renew her contract.

World Wonder Ring Stardom (2017–2018) 
On October 14, 2017, Klein made her debut for the World Wonder Ring Stardom promotion by entering the Goddesses of Stardom Tag League tournament. She ended up winning the tournament along with Bea Priestley. Following the tournament, Klein and Bea unsuccessfully challenged Oedo Tai (Hana Kimura and Kagetsu) for the Goddess of Stardom Championship.

Championships and accomplishments 
Covey Promotions
CP Women's Championship (3 times)
EMERGE Wrestling
EMERGE Women's Championship (1 time)
Mega Championship Wrestling
MEGA Fighting Spirit Championship (1 time)
Pro Wrestling Illustrated
Ranked No. 29 of the top 100 female singles wrestlers in the PWI Women's 100 in 2019
Ring of Honor
Women of Honor World Championship (3 times)
Vicious Outcast Wrestling
VOW Vixen's Championship (1 time)
World Wonder Ring Stardom
Goddesses of Stardom Tag League (2017) – with Bea Priestley

References

1986 births
Living people
People from St. Louis
American female professional wrestlers
Professional wrestlers from Missouri
21st-century American women
20th-century American women
21st-century professional wrestlers
Women of Honor World Champions